The AVN Award for Best Actor is an award that has been given annually by sex industry company AVN since the award's inception in 1984.

Till 2008, the award was awarded annually for two different categoriesfilm and video. From year 2009, it is awarded annually for a single category.

First recipient of the award was Richard Pacheco, who was awarded at 1st AVN Awards in 1984 for his performance in Irresistible. As of 2023, Mike Horner, Randy Spears and Evan Stone are the most honoured pornographic actors with five awards followed by Buck Adams, Steven St. Croix, Tom Byron, Seth Gamble and Tommy Pistol with four awards, Eric Edwards with three awards while five pornographic actorsJon Dough, Dale DaBone, Brad Armstrong, Robert Bullock and James Bonnhave won the award two times. Jamie Gillis is the oldest recipient of the award at the age of 53 for his performance in Bobby Sox (1997) and Steven St. Croix is the youngest recipient of the award at the age of 26 for his performance in Chinatown (1995). The most recent recipient is Seth Gamble, who was honoured at the 40th AVN Awards in 2023 for his performance in Going Up.

Winners and nominees

1980s

1990s

2000s

2010s

2020s

Superlatives

Multiple winners

See also
 AVN Award for Best Supporting Actor, an award that has been given by sex industry company AVN since the award's inception in 1984
 AVN Award for Male Performer of the Year, an award that has been given by sex industry company AVN since the award's inception in 1993
 AVN Award for Male Foreign Performer of the Year, an award that has been given by sex industry company AVN since the award's inception in 2003

References

External links
 

Awards established in 1984
Best Actor
Awards for male actors
Film awards for lead actor